The 2021 Esiliiga B was the ninth season of the Esiliiga B, the third tier of Estonian football. The season began on 6 March 2021 and concluded on 21 November 2021. Viimsi won their first Esiliiga B title.

Teams

Stadiums and locations

League table

Results

Matches 1–18

Matches 19–32

Season statistics

Top scorers

Awards

Monthly awards

Player of the Season
Karl Anton Sõerde was named Esiliiga B Player of the Year.

References

External links
Official website

Esiliiga B seasons
3
Estonia
Estonia